Membranicellariidae is a family of bryozoans belonging to the order Cheilostomatida.

Genera:
 Cookinella d'Hondt, 1981
 Membranicellaria Levinsen, 1909

References

Cheilostomatida